Spurgeon Legreer (Spud) Clements Jr. (September 4, 1928 – July 1, 1992) was an American politician in the state of Florida.

Clements was born in Tampa. He attended the University of Tampa, University of Louisville, FBI National Academy, University of Virginia and Hillsborough Community College. He worked in law enforcement, and is a retired Florida Highway Patrol officer. He served in the Florida House of Representatives from 1980 to 1990 for district 62. He is a member of the Democratic Party. He died in 1992 of complications from surgery.

References

1992 deaths
1928 births
Democratic Party members of the Florida House of Representatives
People from Brandon, Florida
Politicians from Tampa, Florida
University of Tampa alumni
University of Louisville alumni
Hillsborough Community College alumni
20th-century American politicians
FBI National Academy graduates
University of Virginia alumni